Elachista zonulae is a moth of the family Elachistidae that is found in the Alps, the Tatra Mountains in Poland, the Tian Shan Mountains in Kazakhstan, Kyrgyzstan and Tajikistan and the Altai Mountains in Siberia.

There is one generation per year.

The larvae feed on Carex sempervirens and Carex firma. They mine the leaves of their host plant. Pupation usually takes place at the base of the leaf blade of the host plant. The species overwinters as a young larva.

References

zonulae
Moths described in 1992
Moths of Asia
Moths of Europe